The R390 is a Regional Route in South Africa that connects Cradock with Bethulie. It is co-signed with the R56 to Steynsburg for 10 kilometres.

Part of the route from Oviston (Gariep Dam) to Cradock forms part of the shortest road route from Johannesburg to Gqeberha.

External links

 Routes Travel Info

References

Regional Routes in the Free State (province)
Regional Routes in the Eastern Cape